Christian Peter Jonas Haas (12 April 17541804) was a German-Danish engraver, born and initially working in Copenhagen. Two of his brothers, Georg and Meno, and his father Jonas were all engravers. Haas engraved a number of plates documenting Carsten Niebuhr's travels in Arabia, idealizing and moralistic genre art works by Daniel Chodowiecki and related works by Erik Pauelsen. Haas, however, for economic reasons, also undertook to carry out commercial graphics such as business cards, embroidery patterns and almanacs. He elected in 1786 to follow his brother Meno to Berlin, where he continued his diverse business, including portrait miniatures, a series of Berlin Prospectuses, and a series of scenes from Frederick the Great's life. In Berlin he also came to meet Chodowiecki, and became a member of the academies of Paris and Copenhagen. He is represented in the Royal Collection.

References

Sources
 
 

1754 births
1804 deaths
18th-century Danish engravers
19th-century Danish engravers
Artists from Copenhagen